The Noguchi Museum, chartered as The Isamu Noguchi Foundation and Garden Museum, is a museum and sculpture garden in the Long Island City section of Queens, New York City, designed and created by the Japanese American sculptor Isamu Noguchi (1904–1988). Opening on a limited basis to the public in 1985, the museum and foundation were intended to preserve and display Noguchi's sculptures, architectural models, stage designs, drawings, and furniture designs. The two-story,  museum and sculpture garden, one block from the Socrates Sculpture Park, underwent major renovations in 2004 allowing the museum to stay open year-round.

History
To house the museum, in 1974 Noguchi purchased a photogravure plant and gas station located across the street from his New York studio, where he had worked and lived since 1961. The Isamu Noguchi Garden Museum opened to the public in 1985 on a seasonal basis. At the time, it was the first such museum to be established by a living artist in America.

In 1999, the Foundation Board approved a $13.5 million capital master plan to address structural concerns, ADA and NYC Building Code compliance and create a new public education facility. During renovation, the museum relocated to a temporary space in Sunnyside, Queens, and held several thematic exhibitions of Noguchi's work. In February 2004, the museum was formally chartered as a museum, and granted 501(c)(3) public charity status. The Noguchi Museum reopened to the public at its newly renovated space in June 2004. The museum building continued to suffer from structural issues into the early 2000s and a second $8 million stabilization project was begun in September 2008. As a result, there are now 12 galleries and a gift shop within the museum.

In 2022, the museum was awarded $4.5 million in capital funding, $1.5 million of which came from Mayor Eric Adams and the rest from Queens Borough president Donovan Richards. The funds will be used for a restoration of the artist's original 1959 living and studio space situated opposite the museum as well as for a new two-story, 6,000-square-foot building adjacent to the studio to house the museum's collection and archival material.

Tree of Heaven
Until March 26, 2008, a -tall 75-year-old Tree of Heaven (Ailanthus altissima) was a prominent centerpiece of the sculpture garden at the museum. The tree was spared by Noguchi when in 1975 he bought the building which would become the museum and cleaned up its back lot.  "[I]n a sense, the sculpture garden was designed around the tree", said a former aide to Noguchi, Bonnie Rychlak, who later became the museum curator. By early 2008, the tree was found to be dying and threatened to crash into the building, which was about to undergo an $8.2 million renovation. The museum hired the Detroit Tree of Heaven Woodshop, an artists' collective, to use the wood to make benches, sculptures and other amenities in and around the building.

Programs

Exhibition 
The museum celebrated the 25th anniversary of its opening with the exhibition On Becoming an Artist. Isamu Noguchi and His Contemporaries, 1922 - 1960, which open from November 17, 2010, to April 24, 2011

Education
The New York State Council on the Arts has recognized the museum's educational program, Art for Families, as a stellar example of a community outreach program, and Art for Tots as a “superb approach” in making young children comfortable in a museum setting.

Isamu Noguchi Award
Since 2014, the Isamu Noguchi Award has been given annually “to individuals who share [museum founder] Noguchi’s spirit of innovation, global consciousness, and East-West exchange.” Recipients have included:
 2014: Norman Foster, Hiroshi Sugimoto
 2015: Jasper Morrison, Yoshio Taniguchi
 2016: Tadao Ando, Elyn Zimmerman
 2017: John Pawson, Hiroshi Senju
 2018: Naoto Fukasawa, Edwina von Gal
 2019: Rei Kawakubo
 2020: David Adjaye, Cai Guo-Qiang
 2021: Shio Kusaka, Toshiko Mori
 2022: Daniel Brush, Thaddeus Mosley

Directors
 1989–2003: Shoji Sadao
 2003–2017: Jenny Dixon
 2018–present: Brett Littman

See also
 List of museums and cultural institutions in New York City
 List of museums in New York
 List of single-artist museums
 Japanese in New York City

References

External links

 
 A quick visit to the Noguchi Museum
 The Noguchi Museum at Google Cultural Institute

1985 establishments in New York City
Art museums and galleries in New York City
Art museums established in 1985
Artists' studios in the United States
Astoria, Queens
Long Island City
Museums devoted to one artist
Museums in Queens, New York
Sculpture gardens, trails and parks in New York (state)